Leucographus variegatus is a species of beetle in the family Cerambycidae. It was described by Waterhouse in 1878.

Subspecies
 Leucographus variegatus nigropictus Fairmaire, 1886
 Leucographus variegatus pyramidalis (Fairmaire, 1883)
 Leucographus variegatus sparsevariegatus Breuning, 1957
 Leucographus variegatus variegatus Waterhouse, 1878

References

Crossotini
Beetles described in 1878